Sogndal Idrettslag is a Norwegian alliance sports club from Sogndalsfjøra, Vestland. It has departments for association football, handball, volleyball, track and field, orienteering, taekwondo, swimming, powerlifting, speed skating, cross-country skiing, alpine skiing, and gymnastics. The club colors are white and black.

Football

Athletics
Sogndal has been a minnow in Norwegian athletics. Merete Kvist won five consecutive national silver medals in the 800 metres, one for Sogndal, in 1986. Sigurd Langeland, who became Norwegian triple jump champion for IL Høyang, represented Sogndal IL before his period in the national limelight.

The home field is Kvåle stadion.

Skiing
Ingrid Narum has several World Cup starts. Øyvind Sandbakk has two World Cup starts, and only finished the race once, in a 32nd place.

References

External links
Official site 

 
Sports teams in Norway
Sports clubs established in 1926
Athletics clubs in Norway
Sport in Vestland
Sogndal
Multi-sport clubs in Norway
1926 establishments in Norway